Jordy Croux (born 15 January 1994) is a Belgian footballer who currently plays as a winger for Cerezo Osaka from 2023.

Club career

Early career
Croux was born in Hasselt where he began to play football with Runkst VV. He moved to the Racing Genk academy at the age of seven where he progressed through their youth squads.

K.R.C. Genk
Croux made his debut for Racing Genk's senior team on 21 March 2012 during their 3–1 win against Gent when he came in as a substitute for Anthony Limbombe in the 60th minute.

In April 2012, Croux signed a contract extension with the club, which is to end in 2015. He scored his first goal for Genk in their 6–0 win against Saint-Gilloise in the sixth round of the 2012–13 Belgian Cup. It was the first goal of the match, scored in the 14th minute.

Avispa Fukuoka
On 8 January 2021, Croux abroad to Japan and signed transfer to J1 club, Avispa Fukuoka for 2021 season. He leave from the club in 2022 after two years at Fukuoka.

Cerezo Osaka
On 7 December 2022, Croux officially transfer to Cerezo Osaka for upcoming 2023 season.

International career

Belgium U-16
Croux made his international debut for the Belgium U-16s during their 4–0 loss against the Germany U-16 team on 14 October 2009.

Belgium U-17
On 26 August 2010, Croux was part of the Belgium U-17 squad that played and won 1–0 against Switzerland U-17. He played again for the team that lost 3–1 against Spain U-17 on 26 March 2011. He played again two days later in a 2–1 loss against the England U-17 squad.

Belgium U-18
Croux appeared for the Belgium U-18 team in a 1–0 loss against the Germany U-18 team on 13 November 2011.

Belgium U-19
Croux was called up to the Belgium U-19 squad that played against Serbia U-19 in a 0–0 draw on 26 February 2012.

Statistics

Club

International

References

External links
 Voetbal International profile 
 
 
 
 

1994 births
Living people
Sportspeople from Hasselt
Footballers from Limburg (Belgium)
Belgian footballers
Association football defenders
K.R.C. Genk players
Oud-Heverlee Leuven players
MVV Maastricht players
Willem II (football club) players
Roda JC Kerkrade players
Avispa Fukuoka players
Cerezo Osaka players
Belgian expatriate footballers
Belgian Pro League players
Eredivisie players
Eerste Divisie players
J1 League players
Belgium youth international footballers
Expatriate footballers in Japan
Expatriate footballers in the Netherlands
Belgian expatriate sportspeople in Japan
Belgian expatriate sportspeople in the Netherlands